The Livermore-Amador Symphony is a local symphony orchestra composed of musicians from the Tri-Valley in the San Francisco Bay Area, United States.

The Symphony was established in 1963, drawing mainly from the amateur musicians in Livermore, California, and surrounding cities. Four main concerts are played each season, which runs from September to May, as well as a fundraising "Pops" concert series each fall. The four main concerts are held in the Bankhead Theater of the Livermore Valley Performing Arts Center. The repertoire is classical music ranging from baroque to modern.

For the 2010–2011 season, the conductor is Dr. Arthur P. Barnes, a professor emeritus at Stanford University who has conducted the orchestra since 1964 when he was a doctoral student at Stanford. The concertmaster is Kristina Anderson. Dr. Barnes, Ms. Anderson, and the principal cello are the only paid regular players; the rest are volunteers.

The Symphony is a member of the Association of California Symphony Orchestras and the League of American Orchestras. Education and outreach have long been concerns of the Symphony, and a committee was appointed in 1965 to establish an award for a musician graduating from a local high school. This tradition has continued with a few memorial awards added. The Symphony Association has sponsored a yearly competition for young musicians which has discovered some talented young people. .

External links
 Livermore-Amador Symphony

Livermore, California
Musical groups established in 1963
Orchestras based in California